Armand Baeyens (22 June 1928 – 1 July 2013) was a Belgian professional road bicycle racer, who won one stage in the 1951 Tour de France. In 2009 he was awarded a Lifetime Achievement Award at a gala in Denderleeuw.

Major results

1951
Aaigem
Tour de France:
Winner stage 19
1952
Denderhoutem
1953
Aaigem
1954
Aaigem

References

External links 

Official Tour de France results for Armand Baeyens

Belgian male cyclists
1928 births
2013 deaths
Belgian Tour de France stage winners
Cyclists from East Flanders
People from Denderleeuw
20th-century Belgian people